Namonabetiu is a group of atolls within the Federated States of Micronesia; it comprises Puluwat, Pulap, Tamatam, and Pulusuk.

References

Atolls of the Federated States of Micronesia